Capoeta caelestis, the Taurus scraper, is a species of freshwater cyprinid fish endemic to southern Anatolia, Turkey. It is less than 20 cm long.

It is not widespread but inhabits many kinds of streams and habitats and is often quite abundant. It spawns in fast flowing waters.  The range is from Ilica and Manavgat east to Göksu river.

Capoeta caelestis hybridizes in nature with Capoeta antalyensis, forming a hybrid zone.

References 

Caelestis
Fish described in 2009
Taxa named by Müfit Özuluǧ
Taxa named by Jörg Freyhof